Thomas Granville Sharp (born 7 November 1977) is an English cricketer born at Truro in Cornwall whoo has played in the Cornwall Cricket League . Before joining the Unicorns squad during the 2010 Clydesdale Bank 40 competition, Sharp played nine List A matches for Cornwall, for whom he also played in the Minor Counties Cricket Championship.

References

External links

English cricketers
Unicorns cricketers
Cornwall cricketers
1977 births
Living people
Sportspeople from Truro
Cornwall cricket captains